Bruce Anton Bochte (born November 12, 1950) is an American former professional baseball first baseman and outfielder who played in Major League Baseball from – and –. He played his entire career in the American League for the California Angels, Cleveland Indians, Seattle Mariners and Oakland Athletics. Bochte played collegiate ball for the Santa Clara Broncos baseball team until he was drafted in the second round (34th overall) of the 1972 Major League Baseball Draft.

He was called up to the Angels after hitting .355 in 92 games for the Salt Lake City Angels of the Pacific Coast League, and made his major league debut on July 19, 1974. He spent the next four seasons with the Angels, hitting .272 during that span. He batted .290 with two home runs and eight runs batted in (RBI) to begin the 1977 campaign before being traded along with Sid Monge and cash from the Angels to the Indians for Dave LaRoche and Dave Schuler on May 11. After finishing 1977 with Cleveland, he became a free agent and signed with the Seattle Mariners, who he played with for the next five seasons.

Bochte was selected for the American League All-Star team in 1979 when he hit .316 with 100 RBIs and set career highs in virtually every major offensive category. He sat out the entire 1983 season for reasons he never made clear, but returned to play with the Oakland Athletics from 1984–1986.

In a 12-year, 1538 game major league career, Bochte compiled a .282 batting average (1478-for-5233) with 643 runs, 250 doubles, 21 triples, 100 home runs, 658 RBI, 653 walks, 662 strikeouts, .360 on-base percentage and .396 slugging percentage. Defensively, he recorded a career .991 fielding percentage playing at first base and all three outfield positions. For his college career, he was inducted into the Santa Clara University Athletic Hall of Fame in 1987.

As of 2001, Bochte was an avowed agnostic, and was studying cosmology and working on environmental conservation. He stated that he has no contact with anyone from his playing days except for Dusty Baker. Bochte married twice, and has two daughters from his first marriage.

References

1975 Baseball Register published by The Sporting News

External links

College Basketball Stats

1950 births
Living people
California Angels players
Cleveland Indians players
People from Pasadena, California
Seattle Mariners players
Oakland Athletics players
Salt Lake City Angels players
Stockton Ports players
El Paso Sun Kings players
Santa Clara Broncos baseball players
Santa Clara Broncos men's basketball players
American League All-Stars
Major League Baseball first basemen
American agnostics
Baseball players from California
People from Island County, Washington
American men's basketball players
Anchorage Glacier Pilots players